VocaLoca was a Danish pop music a capella quintet from Denmark that existed from 2006–2010. The band consisted of Jan Ulrich Lauridsen, Charlotte Rose Lauridsen, Erik Kolind, Katrine Martinsen Gottschalck and Magnus Glindvad Rasch, and competed in the first season of the Danish version of The X Factor. They were eliminated in the 5th live show, coming in 5th place.

Performances during X Factor 
VocaLoca landed in the bottom two 3 weeks in a row first time with RaiDen, second time with Lisa Birkevist, and third with Basim Moujahid.

Discography

References

External links 
 

Danish pop music groups
X Factor (Danish TV series) contestants